Lilburn may refer to:

Places 
Lilburn, Northumberland, a parish in England
Lilburn, Georgia, a city in the United States
Lilburn (Ellicott City, Maryland), a historic building in the US
Lilburn, Virginia, a settlement in the US

People 
House of Lilburn, an English family historically seated as Lords of the Manor in Northumberland
Douglas Lilburn (1915–2001), New Zealand composer
Tim Lilburn (born 1950), Canadian poet
Lilburn Boggs (1796–1860), governor of Missouri

See also 
Lilburn Cottages, in Maryland, US
Lilburn Tower, a building in Lilburn, England
Lilburne, a surname